Felix Fechenbach (28 January 1894 – 7 August 1933) was a German journalist, poet and political activist. He served as State-Secretary in the government of Kurt Eisner that overthrew the Bavarian Wittelsbach Monarchy. After its overthrow, he worked as a newspaper editor during the Weimar period. After the Nazi seizure of power, he was arrested and later executed.

He was born in Mergentheim, the son of a lower-middle-class Jewish family.  Felix Fechenbach was the son of Noe Fechenbach and Rosalie Fenchenbach. He grew up in poverty. He had four brothers called Max, Siegbert, Mortiz, Abraham, and Jackob Fechenbach. His first job was delivering bread with his older brother Abraham in the town of Würzburg. His first best friend was called Stoffele, the girl next door. Unfortunately, she died at age 7; every time her name was mentioned, he would burst into tears. He started his very first apprenticeship at age 13 at a shoe store.

He took vocational education in Würzburg until 1910. Later, he worked in a shoe store.  In 1911 he secured work in Frankfurt but was later fired for union-activity and because of a strike he led. From 1912 until 1914, he was a party secretary of the SPD in Munich, he served in World War I was wounded, became a pacifist, later becoming state secretary (1918–1919). During World War I he was a pacifist and served as Private Secretary for Kurt Eisner, the prime minister of Bavaria, shortly after the war.

Felix Fechenbach later married Martha Fechenbach on 27 April 1894, and to Irma Epstein on 16 October 1895, and he had a total of three children. After he was killed by an approaching SA commando, on his way to the Dachau concentration camp, his late wife Irma Epstein was able to escape with their children.

He was jailed in 1922 for publishing secret diplomatic telegrams while Staats Secretary under Eisner, before the Bavarian Soviet Republic. The decision was a scandal because the court at that time had no standing under the Weimar Constitution.  He was pardoned in 1924. He thereafter travelled to Berlin and worked for Kinderfreunde (Friends of Children) and criticised the SPD in his children's stories while still a member of the party.

In 1929, he became the editor in chief of the SPD newspaper Volksblatt in Detmold. On 11 March 1933 he was jailed by the new Nazi government for his anti-fascist activities, and was shot on 7 August by members of the SS and SA in a forest between Detmold and Warburg while being transported to the Dachau concentration camp.

There are two schools named after Fechenbach: the Felix-Fechenbach Gesamtschule in Leopoldshoehe
and the Felix-Fechenbach Berufskolleg in Detmold.
A street in Detmold and in Oerlinghausen was also named after him.

Works by Felix Fechenbach 

Im Haus der Freudlosen, J. H. W. Nachfolger, Berlin 1925.

Im Haus der Freudlosen: Als Justizopfer im Zuchthaus Erbach, revised edition edited by Roland Flade
Koenigshausen & Neumann, Wuerzburg 1993.

Mein Herz schlaegt weiter: Briefe aus der Schutzhaft, Kulturverlag, St.Gallen 1936.

Mein Herz schlaegt weiter: Briefe aus der Schutzhaft, revised edition with a foreword by Heinrich Mann, a contribution by Robert M.W. Kempner and a postscript by Peter Steinbach, Andreas-Haller-Verlag, Passau 1987.

Der Puppenspieler, Verlag E. & K. Scheuch, Zuerich 1937.

Der Puppenspieler: Ein Roman aus dem alten Wuerzburg, revised edition edited by Roland Flade and Barbara Rott, Koenigshausen & Neuman, Wuerzburg 1988.

Bibliography 

Felix Fechenbach 1894–1933: Journalist, Schriftsteller, Pazifist
Symposium zum 100. Geburtstag am 28. Und 29. Januar 1994 in Detmold
Landesverband Lippe, Institut fuer Lippische Landeskunde Kreis Lippe.

Das Felix Fechenbach-Buch, Eichenverlag, Arbon 1936.

Hermann Schueler, Auf der Flucht erschossen: Felix Fechenbach 1894–1933,
Kiepenhauer & Wutscgm Jiekb, 1981.

Peter Steinbach, Das Schicksal hat bestimmt, dass ich hierbleibe,
zur Erinnerung an Felix Fechenbach (1894–1933).

Peter Steinbach, Das Schicksal bestimmt, dass ich
hierbleibe, Wissenschaftlicher Autoren Verlag, Berlin 1983.

Herrmann Fechenbach, Die letzten Mergentheimer Juden: 
und die Geschichte der Familie Fechenbach mit Holzschnittillustrationen von Herrmann Fechenbach, Kohlhammer Verlag, Stuttgart 1972.

Douglas Morris, Justice Imperiled: The Anti-Nazi Lawyer Max Hirschberg, The University of Michigan Press, Ann Arbor 2005.

Wolfgang Mueller, Juden in Detmold, Gesammelte Beitraege zur juedischen Geschichte in Detmold, Lippe Verlag, Lage 2008.

Andreas Ruppert, Felix Fechenbach, translated by Katrin von Keitz, lecture given in Detmold, 6 August 2003.

Irma Fechenbach-Fey: Juedin, Sozialistin, Emigrantin 1895–1973.  Landesverband
Lippe, Institut fuer Lippische Landeskundde, Lemgo 2003.

Auf der Flucht erschossen – Felix Fechenbach, Videotape of Bayerischer Rundfunk Production der Media 3, Muenchen 1989.  Videotape.

Felix Fechenabach-Preisverleihung Fernsehbericht 8/6/2003, Bayerischer Rundfunk, Muenchen 2003.  Videotape.

References

External links  

 
 

1894 births
1933 deaths
German male journalists
People from the Kingdom of Württemberg
People from Baden-Württemberg executed by Nazi Germany
Social Democratic Party of Germany politicians
Recipients of German pardons
People from Bad Mergentheim
Executed German people
People executed by Nazi Germany by firearm
German male poets
20th-century German poets
20th-century German male writers
20th-century German journalists
German Jews who died in the Holocaust
German Jewish military personnel of World War I